The Case of the Pope: Vatican Accountability for Human Rights Abuses is a 2010 book by Geoffrey Robertson, detailing failings in the Vatican's handling of cases of sexual abuse in the Catholic church.

Reception
The Economist described The Case of the Pope as "a fine book" that will give readers "a better understanding of the serious problems that can arise when two legal systems, one secular and the other religious, operate in parallel".

The New Statesman said, "Geoffrey Robertson's scalding j'accuse against priestly paedophile perpetrators, the Vatican and the current Pope will likely infuriate most devout Catholics..."

The Monthly called The Case of the Pope a "fiery" argument that "the Vatican should be treated as a kind of 'rogue state' until it stops using statehood and the ancient rules of canon law to protect paedophile priests".

References

External links
 The Case of the Pope, Penguin Books

2010 non-fiction books
Media coverage of Catholic Church sexual abuse scandals
Penguin Books books